International Theatre Festival of Kerala (ITFoK) is an international theatre festival held every year in December in Thrissur city of Kerala State, India. The festival is organised by Kerala Sangeetha Nataka Akademi and Cultural Department of Government of Kerala. The festival was started in 2008.

History
The International Theatre Festival of Kerala (ITFoK) began in 2008 by Kerala Sangeetha Nataka Akademi under the leadership of late Murali (Malayalam actor) in Thrissur city. From world over independent, experimental and contemporary theatre groups participate in this festival.

Venues
The festival is held in G.Sankara Pillai Cultural Complex in Thrissur city over eight days. The main stages are Murali Outdoor Theatre and K. T. Muhammed Regional Theatre.

See also 
 List of theatre festivals

References

Theatre festivals in India
Festivals in Thrissur district
Culture of Thrissur
Festivals established in 2008
2008 establishments in Kerala